Long Beach High School, also known as Long Beach Senior High School, is a suburban public high school located in Long Beach, Mississippi, United States. It is in the Long Beach School District. The school was selected as a National Blue Ribbon School in 2007.  Long Beach High School was ranked a B through Mississippi Department of Education's school report card program.

Long Beach High School's mascot is the Bearcat, and its team colors are maroon and white.

Extracurricular activities

Sports teams include baseball, football, basketball, golf, cross-country, volleyball, tennis, soccer, slow pitch softball, fast pitch softball, band, track and field, swimming, and cheerleading.

Honors

Academics
Teams from Long Beach High School took first place in the four-state regional ocean sciences bowl at The University of Southern Mississippi Gulf Coast Research Laboratory (GCRL) in 2008 and 2009.

Sports
Volleyball – State Champions 2010-11

References

External links
 LBHS official website
 Long Beach School District official website
  U.S. News & World Report rating
 LBHS alumni website

Public high schools in Mississippi
Schools in Harrison County, Mississippi